The rugby sevens at the 2022 Commonwealth Games – Women's tournament was the women's event of the Commonwealth Games rugby sevens competition held every four years. It was held at the Coventry Stadium from 29 to 31 July 2022.

Venue
The tournaments were originally scheduled to take place at Villa Park, but they instead took place at the Coventry Stadium in Coventry.

The adjacent Coventry Arena will play host to judo and wrestling.

Qualification 
England qualified as host nation, three nations qualified via the World Rugby Women's Sevens Series, and four nations booked their places in regional qualification tournaments.

Competition format
In July 2022, eight teams were drawn into two groups; the top two performing teams in each group advanced to the semi-finals, whilst the remaining teams were sent to lower classification matches to determine their final ranking.

Pool stage

Pool A

Pool B

Medal round

Semi-finals

Bronze medal match

Gold medal match

Classification matches

Classification semi-finals

Seventh place match

Fifth place match

Final standing

Player statistics

Most points

Most tries

Notes

References

 
2022
Rugby sevens competitions in England
2022 rugby sevens competitions
2022 in women's rugby union
Women's rugby sevens competitions
International rugby union competitions hosted by England